Jan Schöppner (born 12 June 1999) is a German professional footballer who plays as a midfielder for 1. FC Heidenheim.

Career
Schöppner joined 2. Bundesliga club 1. FC Heidenheim in August 2020 from SC Verl. He made his professional debut for Heidenheim in the first round of the 2020–21 DFB-Pokal on 13 September 2020, starting against 3. Liga side Wehen Wiesbaden before being substituted out in the 57th minute for Jonas Föhrenbach. The away match finished as a 1–0 loss.

References

External links
 
 Jan Schöppner at kicker.de
 
 
 Career statistics

1999 births
Living people
German footballers
Association football midfielders
SC Verl players
1. FC Heidenheim players
2. Bundesliga players
Regionalliga players